Emil Johansson (born May 6, 1996) is a Swedish professional ice hockey defenceman currenrtly playing for EHC Red Bull München of the Deutsche Eishockey Liga (DEL). Johansson was selected by the Boston Bruins in the seventh round (206th overall) of the 2014 NHL Entry Draft.

Playing career
Johansson played as a youth within Åseda IF and HV71 organizations. On October 1, 2014, Johansson was signed to a first team contract with HV71 for two-years. After playing his first two SHL seasons with HV71, for the 2016–17 SHL season, Johansson signed a one-season contract for Stockholm-based club Djurgårdens IF. Johansson appeared in 49 games and collected a personal best 7 goals and 17 points.

On March 24, 2017, Johansson agreed to a three-year entry-level contract with the Boston Bruins. He was immediately assigned to complete the 2016–17 season, with AHL affiliate the Providence Bruins on a professional try-out basis. On May 13, 2019, Johansson signed a three-year deal with HV71.

On 19 May 2021, Johansson left newly demoted HV71, and signed a one-year contract with Finnish top tier club, Vaasan Sport of the Liiga.

During the 2022–23 season, his second with Vaasan, Johansson contributed with 24 points through 43 games before leaving the club to join German club, EHC München of the DEL, for the remainder of the season on 14 February 2023.

Career statistics

Regular season and playoffs

International

References

External links

1996 births
Boston Bruins draft picks
Djurgårdens IF Hockey players
HV71 players
Living people
People from Växjö
Providence Bruins players
Swedish ice hockey defencemen
Vaasan Sport players
Sportspeople from Kronoberg County